Cycling in the Australian state of New South Wales (including its capital Sydney) is a common form of recreation. In 2009, cycling was the fifth-most popular sports/physical activity in NSW.

Common cycling activities in NSW include
 commuting
 racing
 touring
 mountain biking

Bicycle User Groups

Regional BUGs
 Ballina
 IBUG (Illawarra)
 KBUG (Kiama)
 NCM (Newcastle Cycleways Movement)

Sydney BUGs
Sydney BUGS range from University clubs to commuter groups.

Regional Trails
Bicycle routes in NSW are poorly marked, if markings are present, and route mapping is predominantly the responsibility of the cyclist.  In particular, separated cycleways or shared paths have their entrances and exits poorly marked for cyclists using the NSW system of highways for travel.  State mandated routes do exist chiefly as part of the aspiration for a Coastline cycleway, though these are disconnected and sporadic, with long routes in the Illawarra and Hunter Valley.

Occasionally regional council routes manage to connect, though often this is due to the accident of high-speed routes following major vehicle highways as on-road facilities on the shoulder, such as the link between Maitland and Newcastle via the New England Highway's shoulder.

Most regional bicycle trails and routes tend to be disconnected sections of shared pathway, aimed predominantly at leisure or local shopping purposes.

Annual Rides
 Bathurst to Blaney
 Loop the Lake (Lake Macquarie)
 Sydney Spring Cycle (North Sydney to Olympic Park)
 The 'Gong Ride (Sydney to Wollongong)
 Ride Around the Lake (40 km loop around Lake Illawarra in Wollongong)
 Wollombi Wild Ride (15, 30 and 60 km versions)

Annual Races
 Cootamundra Haycarters and Recovery Race
 Cootamundra Classic and Recovery Race
 Wagga Wagga Cycle Classic and Criterium
 John Woodman Memorial - Wagga to Albury Cycle Classic
 Tolland Classic
 Ken Dinnerville Handicap
 Keegan Downes Memorial Handicap 
 Gunnedah to Tamworth 
 Grafton to Inverell Classic
 Indian Pacific Wheel Race

Public transport

Buses
Bicycles are generally not carried on buses operated by the Government in NSW cities and towns. There are some exceptions, such as when cyclists are stranded by a ferry or train service being cancelled and buses are organised to carry passengers, including their bicycles.

Bicycles are carried by Country Link and private coaches on regional routes.

Ferries
See here for details about taking bicycles on ferries in Sydney.

Trains
For the price of a child's ticket, you can take your bicycle on NSW TrainLink Endeavour and Xplorer services to regional areas such as Kiama, Goulbourn and Canberra and Armidale. Hanging space is provided for bicycles in every second carriage.

XPT services (Melbourne, Brisbane, Dubbo) require bicycles to be boxed and placed in the luggage car.

Regulations
Cyclists have the same rights and responsibilities as other road users, but have additional rules specific to them. They are permitted to ride two abreast, and travel in "Transit Lanes" and "Bus Lanes", but not "Bus Only Lanes" and are allowed to "hook turn" at intersections and roundabouts. Cyclists can only ride on a footpath if they're under the age of 16 or supervising a child under 16. NSW and Victoria are the only states to impose restrictions on footpath riding.

Since 1989 Australian cyclists must wear a helmet at all times, and are required to have a working bell and proper reflectors and night lighting when riding at night.

There is no requirement for cyclists to be registered however there was an unsuccessful attempt to force riders to carry ID.

Motorist Regulations
Cars must stay a minimum of 1m away from cyclists when passing under 60 km/h and 1.5m when travelling over 60 km/h and are permitted to cross white lines to do so.

Relevant Legislation
Road Transport (Safety and Traffic Management) Act 1999 No 20 
Part 3 Division 1 Section 43  Menacing driving

See also
 Cycling in Sydney
 Cycling in Australia
 Bicycle User Group

References

External links
 Bicycle Network Website
 NSW Bike Plan - Bicycle Information for New South Wales
 Bicycle NSW
 Cycling NSW

Cycling in New South Wales (Australia)